Sanhe, formerly Heicheng, is a town in Haiyuan County, Ningxia, China, located  southeast of the county seat ,and about the same distance north-northwest of Guyuan as the crow flies. , it has 13 villages under its administration.

See also
List of township-level divisions of Ningxia

References

Township-level divisions of Ningxia
Haiyuan County